Josina Maria "Jozien" Bensing (born 12 March 1950) is a Dutch clinical psychologist. Since 1993 she has been a professor of clinical and healthcare psychology at Utrecht University. Bensing was a winner of the 2006 Spinoza Prize.

Career
Bensing was born on 12 March 1950 in Tilburg. She studied clinical psychology at Utrecht University. Bensing obtained a PhD at the Erasmus University Rotterdam in 1991, her thesis was titled: "Doctor-patient communication and the quality of care. An observation study into affective and instrumental behavior in general practice".

In 1974 Bensing started as a researcher at the Dutch Institute for General Practice (Dutch: Nederlands Huisartsen Instituut). Two years later she became leader of the project "Psycho social care in general practice". She kept this position for two a further two years and in 1979 became the head of the research department. In 1984 she became acting director. She served in this position until 2008 and then continued as an honorary research fellow. Apart from her work at NIVEL Bensing has been a professor of clinical psychology and healthcare psychology at Utrecht University since 1993. Between 1996 and 1998 she served as dean of the faculty.

Bensing's research has focused on the role of communication in doctor-patient relations. Her research also has links to the placebo effect. She has done research on large quantities of video recorded conversations between doctors and patients and has built a database of over 16,000 entries.

Awards and honours
Bensing was awarded the George Engel Award by the American Academy on Physician and Patients in 2003, and was the first non-American to obtain it.

In 2006 she was one of four winners of the Dutch Spinoza Prize and received a 1.5 million euro grant. The awarding commission cited her "multidisciplinary research into the communication between doctors and patients, and her internationally used research method for quantifying non-verbal communication".

Bensing was elected a member of the Royal Netherlands Academy of Arts and Sciences in 2007.

In 2004 Bensing was named an Officer in the Order of Orange-Nassau. In 2015 she was made a Knight in the Order of the Netherlands Lion.

References

External links
 Profile on Utrecht University website

1950 births
Living people
Clinical psychologists
Dutch psychologists
Dutch women psychologists
Erasmus University Rotterdam alumni
Knights of the Order of the Netherlands Lion
Members of the Royal Netherlands Academy of Arts and Sciences
Officers of the Order of Orange-Nassau
People from Tilburg
Spinoza Prize winners
Utrecht University alumni
Academic staff of Utrecht University